Between 1990 and 1999, there were 89 Thor-based rockets launched, of which 85 were successful, giving a 95.5% success rate.

Notable missions

Mars Pathfinder

Mars Climate Orbiter

Launch statistics

Rocket configurations

Launch sites

Launch outcomes

Launch history

1990
There were 13 Thor missiles launched in 1990. All 13 launches were successful.

1991
There were 6 Thor missiles launched in 1991. All 6 launches were successful.

1992 
There were 12 Thor missiles launched in 1992. All 12 launches were successful.

1993
There were 7 Thor missiles launched in 1993. All 7 launches were successful.

1994
There were 3 Thor missiles launched in 1994. All 3 launches were successful.

1995 
There were 3 Thor missiles launched in 1995. 2 of the 3 launches were successful, giving a 66.7% success rate.

1996
There were 10 Thor missiles launched in 1996. All 10 launches were successful.

1997
There were 11 Thor missiles launched in 1997. 10 of the 11 launches were successful, giving a 90.9% success rate.

1998
There were 13 Thor missiles launched in 1998. 12 of the 13 launches were successful, giving a 92.3% success rate.

1999
There were 11 Thor missiles launched in 1999. 10 of the 11 launches were successful, giving a 90.9% success rate.

References 

 
 
 
 

Lists of Thor and Delta launches
Lists of Delta launches